The Quoile Bridge is a railway bridge across the River Quoile in Downpatrick, County Down, Northern Ireland.

History

Belfast & County Down Railway 
The original bridge was constructed in 1859, one of the few river crossings on the Belfast and County Down Railway. It carried trains from Queen's Quay to Downpatrick and Newcastle. This bridge was made of timber piles with lattice trusses, and was replaced in 1929 with a steel girder bridge. After the railway was closed by the Ulster Transport Authority in 1950 (Having taken it over just two years prior), the bridge was abandoned and the girders and deck removed, through the concrete abutments and centre pier remained.

Downpatrick & County Down Railway 
In 1999, Northern Ireland's only Irish standard gauge heritage railway, the Downpatrick and County Down Railway. began reconstructing the line from Downpatrick towards Belfast. This meant reconstructing the Quoile Bridge, which was done with £110,000 1929-replica girders fabricated in Dunmurry and brought to Downpatrick by lorry. The bridge opened to passenger traffic in 2004.

Today 
The Quoile Bridge is one of most notable features of the Downpatrick & Co. Down Railway. It carries their 'North Line' from Downpatrick to Inch Abbey railway station and sees regular use, carrying over 10 trains per day on the weekends around St. Patrick's Day, May Day, Easter, the summer holidays and New Year's.

References 

Railway bridges in Northern Ireland
Buildings and structures in County Down